Tympanocryptis cephalus, the blotch-tailed earless dragon or coastal pebble-mimic dragon, is a species of agama found in Australia.

References

cephalus
Agamid lizards of Australia
Taxa named by Albert Günther
Reptiles described in 1867